Barabra is a term for the Nubian peoples of the northern Sudan and southern Egypt. The word is originally derived from the Greek word bárbaros (i.e. Berbers) that was deformed to "barbarus" in Roman. It was originally used by Greeks to describe all foreigners (non Greek people). In addition, the word barabra is used in Arabic in the plural form "برابرة", hence the added 'a' between the 'r' and 'b' in 'Barabra'. When the locals use it in singular form to refer to one individual, they use the word "بربري" (in English transliteration "barbari"), an Arabized form of the Roman word "barbarus"; the ending letter 'ي' in Arabic or 'i' in English transliteration has the effect of transforming the word into an adjective, just as "مصر" (Masr) refers to Egypt as a country, while one says 'مصري' (Masri) to refer to an Egyptian individual.

The word barbarus was originally used to describe many other foreign non-Greek nations, including ancient Egyptians, Persians, Medes and Phoenicians, while the term egyptiote was used to describe Greeks living in Egypt.

See also
:ar:برابرة
Barbaria
Barbarian

Notes

References
 
 
 
 Siculus Diodorus, Ludwig August Dindorf, Diodori Bibliotheca historica – Volume 1 – Page 671

History of Sudan
Nubian people
Ethnic groups in Sudan
Egyptian people of Nubian descent
Sudanese people of Nubian descent